The following is an incomplete list of notable people who have been deported from the United States. The U.S. Department of Justice (DOJ), particularly the U.S. Department of Homeland Security (DHS) and the Executive Office for Immigration Review (EOIR), handles all matters of deportation. Their decisions may be appealed and reviewed by federal judges. 

In several cases (i.e., Charlie Chaplin, Adam Habib  and Conrad Gallagher), the orders of deportation and/or exclusion were later lifted. Among many changes in terminology, "removal" superseded "deportation" in 1996 following the enactment of Illegal Immigration Reform and Immigrant Responsibility Act (IIRIRA).

Aside from the Alien and Sedition Acts of 1798, there was no applicable deportation law in the United States until an 1882 statute specifically geared towards Chinese immigrants. The Alien and Sedition Acts gave the President of the United States the power to arrest and subsequently deport any alien that he deemed dangerous. The 1882 Chinese Exclusion Act was designed to suspend Chinese immigration to the United States, and deport Chinese residents that were termed as illegally residing in the country. The types of individuals that could be deported from the United States was later reclassified to include those who were insane or carrying a disease, convicts, prostitutes, those entering the United States over the immigration quotas, anarchists, and those that belonged to organizations which supported the overthrow of the United States government by use of violence.

Legislation enacted by the U.S. Congress in 1891 gave a time limit of one year after an alien entered the country for the individual to be deported and decreased judicial review of deportation proceedings. The office of superintendent of immigration in the Department of the Treasury was also created with the 1891 enactment, and this responsibility later passed to the Immigration and Naturalization Service (INS). During the Red Scare in 1919, a number of persons were deported under suspicion of illegal activity. The statute of limitations on deportation from the United States was removed under the Immigration and Nationality Act of 1952. Deportation laws were cited during the 1950s in order to remove union leaders and alleged members of the Communist party said to be illegally in the country. According to Funk & Wagnalls New World Encyclopedia, about 23,000 aliens were deported annually from the country during the latter period of the 1980s.

If an alien is deemed by the government to be removable, they will receive a "notice to appear" (NTA) and later face an immigration judge, who will decide whether or not the alien is removable from the United States. Either party (the alien or the government prosecutor) may appeal (by legal brief, not in person) an immigration judge's decision to the Board of Immigration Appeals (BIA). If an alien fails to appear for any immigration hearing, they is usually ordered removed in absentia. Those individuals who illegally entered the United States constitute the single largest portion of people deported from the country. Once deported or removed, an alien is not allowed to legally reenter the country unless given special permission to do so by either the DHS or the EOIR. The DHS has placed 164,000 criminals in removal proceedings in 2007, and estimated that figure would be 200,000 for 2008.

In 2001, approximately 73,000 illegal aliens with criminal convictions were deported from the United States, and in 2007 this figure was 91,000. In 2011, the DHS deported 396,906 people. Of those deported, 54.6% were criminal offenders.

List

See also

 Illegal immigration to the United States
 List of denaturalized former citizens of the United States
 U.S. Immigration and Customs Enforcement
 List of people barred or excluded from the United States

References

External links
 U.S. Immigration and Customs Enforcement

Illegal immigration to the United States
Lists of people by location
Lists of people by legal status

United States immigration law